Arvid Beckman (14 June 1889 – 9 September 1970) was a Swedish wrestler. He competed in the featherweight event at the 1912 Summer Olympics.

References

External links
 

1889 births
1970 deaths
Olympic wrestlers of Sweden
Wrestlers at the 1912 Summer Olympics
Swedish male sport wrestlers
Sportspeople from Gothenburg